"On Repeat" is a song performed by Australian contemporary worship band Hillsong United. It was on 21 January 2022, as the third single from their sixth studio album, Are We There Yet? (2022). The song was written by Benjamin Hastings, and Joel Houston. Michael Guy Chislett and Joel Houston handled the production of the single.

"On Repeat" peaked at No. 34 on the US Hot Christian Songs chart.

Background
Hillsong United released "On Repeat" as a single on 21 January 2022, following the release of the singles "Know You Will" and "Sure Thing" in 2021. Joel Houston of Hillsong United shared the story behind the song, saying:

Composition

Critical reception
Jono Davies of Louder Than The Music gave a positive review of "On Repeat," saying "In recent years Hillsong United have produced songs that are stripped back, leaving the song in its most raw form straying away from more studio creativity and this has worked well for them, and this song is no different. If anything this works better for a song like this, I think in a live setting this song will come into its own."

Commercial performance
"On Repeat" debuted at number 34 on the US Hot Christian Songs chart dated 5 February 2022.

Music videos
On 21 January 2022, Hillsong United released the official lyric video for "On Repeat" via YouTube. On 23 February 2022, Hillsong United punlished the official music video for "On Repeat" through YouTube.

Personnel
Credits adapted from AllMusic.

 Michael Guy Chislett — acoustic guitar, electric guitar, producer
 Matt Crocker — background vocals
 Jonathan Douglass — background vocals
 Andrea García	A&R
 Taya Gaukrodger — vocals
 Jad Gillies — vocals
 Bruno Gruel — mastering engineer
 Nigel Hendroff — acoustic guitar
 Hillsong United — primary artist
 Joel Houston — background vocals, executive producer, keyboards, producer, programmer
 Tahisha Hunt — background vocals
 Simon Kobler — percussion
 Daniel McMurray — drums
 Johnny Rays — management
 Ben Tan — programmer
 Benjamin Tennikoff — bass, drums, keyboards, programmer
 Matt Tennikoff — bass
 Dylan Thomas — electric guitar
 Ben Whincop — mixing engineer
 Chris York — A&R
 Michael Zuvela — programmer

Charts

Release history

References

External links
 

2022 songs
2022 singles
Hillsong United songs